A multi-area agreement (MAA) was an English political framework that aimed to encourage cross boundary partnership working at the regional and sub-regional levels. They were defined by the Department for Communities and Local Government (DCLG) as voluntary agreements between two or more top tier (county councils or metropolitan district councils) or unitary local authorities, their partners and the government to work collectively to improve local economic prosperity.

There were 15 signed off multi-area agreements in England: However, these were folded into the new Local Enterprise Partnerships created by the Conservative/Liberal Democrat coalition government and were finally repealed under the Deregulation Act 2015.

Additionally there were five areas who were in negotiations with DCLG regarding the development of an MAA:
 Gatwick Diamond
Hull and Humber
Milton Keynes South Midlands
Nottingham
Regional Cities East

References

External links
Map of MMA areas in England

Local government in England